Maria Flechtenmacher (born Maria Mavrodin; 1838–1888) was a Romanian writer, publicist and pedagogue.

Her parents were Costache and Anica Mavrodin. She was educated in private girls schools. In 1850–1853, she was active as an actress, and after her marriage to the composer Alexandru Flechtenmacher, she continued as a teacher in declamation at the Elena Doamna. In 1871, she published her own poems, Poezii şi proză. From 1878 to 1881, she was the editor of the women's magazine Femeea Română and a spokesperson for women's rights.

References

 George Marcu (coord.), Dicţionarul personalităţilor feminine din România, Editura Meronia, București, 2009.

1838 births
1888 deaths
19th-century Romanian poets
Romanian women poets
19th-century Romanian dramatists and playwrights
Women dramatists and playwrights
19th-century Romanian actresses
Romanian women journalists
Romanian magazine editors
Romanian schoolteachers
Romanian feminists
19th-century Romanian women writers
19th-century Romanian writers
Women magazine editors